Jasper Howat Kerr (2 December 1895–1979) was a Scottish footballer who played in the Football League for Everton, New Brighton and Preston North End.

References

1898 births
1986 deaths
Scottish footballers
Association football defenders
English Football League players
Burnbank Athletic F.C. players
Larkhall Thistle F.C. players
Bathgate F.C. players
Everton F.C. players
Preston North End F.C. players
New Brighton A.F.C. players
Lancaster City F.C. players